The Graceful Ghost is Grey DeLisle's third album. It was released in 2004 on Sugar Hill Records, and is a tribute to Johnny Cash and June Carter Cash.

Track listing
All songs by Grey DeLisle, unless otherwise noted.

"The Jewel of Abilene" – 2:34
"Sweet Savior's Arms" – 3:32
"Sharecroppin' Man" – 2:56
"Walking In a Line" – 3:12
"The Maple Tree" – 3:42
"Tell Me True" – 2:28
"Turtle Dove" – 2:04
"Black Haired Boy" – 2:53
"Katy Allen" – 4:24
"This White Circle on My Finger" (Bainbridge, Lewis) – 3:13
"Sawyer" – 3:25
"Pretty Little Dreamer" – 2:05

Personnel
Grey DeLisle – Vocals, Autoharp, Music box
Marvin Etzioni – Acoustic guitar, Guitar, Piano, Celeste, Producer, Slide guitar, Soloist, Banjolin, Music box, Double bass
Sheldon Gomberg – Double bass
Murry Hammond – Acoustic guitar, Guitar, Rhythm guitar, Harmonium, Vocals, Yodeling, Music box
Greg Leisz – Chords

Notes
"This White Circle on My Finger" is a cover song originally recorded by Kitty Wells.

2004 albums
Grey DeLisle albums
Sugar Hill Records albums